General Riley may refer to:

Guy Riley (1884–1964), British Army major general
Jonathon Riley (British Army officer) (born 1955), British Army lieutenant general
Thomas F. Riley (1912–1998), U.S. Marine Corps brigadier general
William E. Riley (1897–1970), U.S. Marine Corps lieutenant general

See also
General Reilly (disambiguation)